Wendy Horman is an American politician from Idaho. Horman is a Republican member of Idaho House of Representatives since 2012 representing District 30 in the B seat.

Early life 
Horman graduated from Roy High School.

Education 
Horman earned an Associate degree from Dixie State College and a Bachelor of Arts in political science from Brigham Young University–Idaho.

Career 
In 2002, Horman became a board trustee of Bonneville Joint School District, until 2013, and she was a treasurer for seven years. In 2006, Horman became the president of the Idaho School Boards Association, until 2007.

Idaho House of Representatives

Committee assignments
Vice Chair - Appropriations Committee
Environment, Energy and Technology Committee
Joint Finance-Appropriations Committee
Ethics Committee
Horman previously served on the Education Committee from 2013 to 2014, the Judiciary, Rules and Administration Committee from 2013 to 2014, the Commerce and Human Resources Committee and the Local Government Committee from 2013 to 2016.

Horman lost her bid for Speaker of the Idaho House of Representatives in 2020 to the incumbent; Scott Bedke.

Election history

Awards 
 2017, Women of the Year. Presented by Idaho Business Review.
 2017 Ag All Stars. Presented by Food Producers of Idaho.
 University of Virginia Darden School of Business Emerging Leader Award for Idaho.
 Bluum School Choice in Idaho Award.

Personal life 
She and her husband Briggs have five children and live in Ammon, Idaho.

Horman is an organ player and a member of American Guild of Organists.

References

External links
Wendy Horman at the Idaho Legislature
Campaign site
 Wendy Horman at ballotpedia.org
 Wendy Horman at idahoednews.org (February 10, 2013)

Place of birth missing (living people)
Year of birth missing (living people)
Living people
Brigham Young University–Idaho alumni
Republican Party members of the Idaho House of Representatives
People from Bonneville County, Idaho
Women state legislators in Idaho
21st-century American politicians
21st-century American women politicians